The Bollinger Everyman Wodehouse Prize is the United Kingdom's first literary award for comic literature. Established in 2000 and named in honour of P. G. Wodehouse, past winners include Paul Torday in 2007 with Salmon Fishing in the Yemen and Marina Lewycka with A Short History of Tractors in Ukrainian 2005 and Jasper Fforde for The Well of Lost Plots in 2004. Gary Shteyngart was the first American winner in 2011.

The Prize is sponsored and organized by Bollinger, a producer of sparkling wines from the Champagne region of France, and Everyman Library, a book imprint that is a division of Random House.

The winner is announced at the annual Hay Festival in May and is presented with a jeroboam of Champagne Bollinger Special Cuvée and 52 volumes of the Everyman Wodehouse edition; a Gloucestershire Old Spots pig is named after the winning novel.

Past winners and shortlists

2000 Howard Jacobson - The Mighty Walzer (Jonathan Cape)
Helen Fielding -  The Edge of Reason (Viking)
Tony Hawks - Playing the Moldovans at Tennis (Ebury Press)
Hugh Massingberd - The Book of Obituaries (Pan Books)
Sue Townsend - Adrian Mole: The Cappuccino Years (Michael Joseph)

2001 Jonathan Coe - The Rotters' Club (Viking)

2002 Michael Frayn - Spies (Faber and Faber)
Terry Eagleton - The Gatekeeper (St. Martin's Press)
Lissa Evans - Spencer's List (Viking)
Dave Gorman - Are You Dave Gorman? (Ebury Press)
Terry Pratchett - Thief of Time (Doubleday)

2003 DBC Pierre - Vernon God Little (Faber and Faber)
Lucy Ellmann - Dot in the Universe (Bloomsbury)
India Knight - Don't You Want Me (Penguin)
Yann Martel - Life of Pi (Knopf Canada)
Allison Pearson - I Don't Know How She Does It (Chatto & Windus)
Zadie Smith - The Autograph Man (Hamish Hamilton)

2004 Jasper Fforde - The Well of Lost Plots (Hodder & Stoughton)
Andrey Kurkov - Penguin Lost (Vintage)
Deborah Moggach - These Foolish Things (Vintage)
Alexei Sayle - Overtaken (Sceptre)

2005 Marina Lewycka - A Short History of Tractors in Ukrainian (Viking)
James Hamilton-Paterson - Cooking with Fernet Branca (Faber and Faber)
Lloyd Jones - Mr Vogel (Seren)
Tiffany Murray - Happy Accidents (Harper Perennial)
Terry Pratchett - Going Postal (Doubleday)
Malcolm Pryce - The Unbearable Lightness of Being in Aberystwyth (Bloomsbury)

2006 Christopher Brookmyre - All Fun and Games until Somebody Loses an Eye (Abacus)
Jilly Cooper - Wicked! (Bantam Press)
Robert Lewis - The Last Llanelli Train (Serpent's Tail)
John O'Farrell - May Contain Nuts (Doubleday)
Terry Pratchett - Thud! (Doubleday)
Zadie Smith - On Beauty (Hamish Hamilton)

2007 Paul Torday - Salmon Fishing in the Yemen (Weidenfeld & Nicolson)
Marina Lewycka - Two Caravans (Penguin, Fig Tree)
Howard Jacobson - Kalooki Nights (Jonathan Cape)
David Nobbs - Cupid's Dart (Heinemann)

2008 Will Self - The Butt (Bloomsbury)
Alan Bennett - The Uncommon Reader (Faber and Faber)
Joe Dunthorne - Submarine (Hamish Hamilton)
Julian Gough - Jude: Level 1 (Old Street)
Garrison Keillor - Pontoon: A Novel of Lake Wobegon (Viking Press)
John Walsh - Sunday at the Cross Bones (Harper Perennial)

2009 Geoff Dyer - Jeff in Venice, Death in Varanasi (Canongate Books)
Christopher Brookmyre - A Snowball in Hell (Little, Brown Book Group)
Lissa Evans - Their Finest Hour and a Half (Transworld/Doubleday)
James Hamilton-Paterson - Rancid Pansies (Faber and Faber)
Saša Stanišić - How the Soldier Repairs the Gramophone (Weidenfeld & Nicolson)
Steve Toltz - A Fraction of the Whole (Hamish Hamilton, Australia)

2010 Ian McEwan – Solar (Jonathan Cape)
Paul Murray - Skippy Dies (Hamish Hamilton)
Tiffany Murray - Diamond Star Halo (Portobello)
David Nicholls - One Day (Hodder & Stoughton)
Malcolm Pryce - From Aberystwyth with Love (Bloomsbury)

2011 Gary Shteyngart - Super Sad True Love Story (Granta)
Manu Joseph - Serious Men (John Murray)
India Knight - Comfort and Joy (Penguin, Fig Tree)
Sam Leith - The Coincidence Engine (Bloomsbury)
Catherine O'Flynn - The News Where You Are (Penguin)

2012 Terry Pratchett - Snuff (Transworld/Doubleday)
Julian Gough – Jude in London (Old Street)
John Lanchester – Capital (W. W. Norton)
John O'Farrell – The Man Who Forgot His Wife (Doubleday)
Sue Townsend – The Woman Who Went to Bed for a Year (Michael Joseph)

2013 Howard Jacobson – Zoo Time (Bloomsbury)
Joseph Connolly – England's Lane (Quercus)
Helen DeWitt – Lightning Rods (And Other Stories)
Michael Frayn – Skios (Faber and Faber)
Deborah Moggach – Heartbreak Hotel (Chatto & Windus)

2014 Edward St Aubyn - Lost for Words (Picador) 
Sebastian Faulks - Jeeves and the Wedding Bells (Hutchinson)
Helen Fielding - Bridget Jones: Mad About the Boy (Jonathan Cape)
Hanif Kureishi - The Last Word (Faber&Faber)
John Niven - Straight White Male (William Heinemann)
Joseph O'Connor - The Thrill of it All (Harvill Secker)

2015 Alexander McCall Smith - Fatty O'Leary's Dinner Party (Polygon)  
Helen Lederer - Losing It (Pan Macmillan)
Caitlin Moran - How to Build a Girl (Ebury)
Joseph O'Neill - The Dog (4th Estate)
Nina Stibbe - Man at the Helm (Viking, Penguin)
Irvine Welsh - A Decent Ride (Jonathan Cape)

2016 Paul Murray - The Mark and the Void (Penguin) & Hannah Rothschild - The Improbability of Love (Bloomsbury)
Paul Beatty - The Sellout (Oneworld)
Marina Lewycka - The Lubetkin Legacy (Penguin Random House)
John O'Farrell - There's Only Two David Beckhams (Black Swan, Transworld)

2017 Helen Fielding - Bridget Jones’s Baby: The Diaries (Vintage) 
Carl Hiaasen - Razor Girl (Little, Brown)
James Robertson - To Be Continued. . . (Penguin Random House)
Richard Russo - Everybody's Fool (Atlantic Books)
Nina Stibbe - Paradise Lodge (Penguin Random House)
Simon Wroe - Here Comes Trouble (Orion Books)

2018 - Not awarded

2019 Nina Stibbe - Reasons to be Cheerful (Little, Brown and Company)
Jen Beagin - Vacuum in the Dark (Simon & Schuster)
Kate Davies - In at the Deep End (Houghton Mifflin Harcourt)
Roddy Doyle - Charlie Savage (Jonathan Cape)
Lissa Evans - Old Baggage (Harper Perennial)
Paul Ewen - Francis Plug: Writer in Residence (Galley Beggar Press)

 2020 Matthew Dooley - Flake (Jonathan Cape)
Oisín Fagan - Nobber (John Murray)
Jessica Francis Kane – Rules for Visiting (Granta)
Jenny Offill - Weather (Granta)
Alastair Puddick – 46% Better than Dave (Raven Crest Books)
Hannah Rothschild – House of Trelawney (Bloomsbury)

 2021 Guy Kennaway - The Accidental Collector (Mensch)
Dolly Alderton - Ghosts (Penguin)
 A. Naji Bakhti - Between Beirut and the Moon (Influx)
Diksha Basu - Destination Wedding (Bloomsbury)
 Hilary Leichter - Temporary (Faber)
Lauren Oyler - Fake Accounts (Fourth Estate)

References

External links
 

British fiction awards
Awards established in 2000
2000 establishments in the United Kingdom
Comedy and humor literary awards